White Moonlight is a novel by F. J. Thwaites.

It was adapted for radio in the 1960s.

References

External links
White Moonlight at AustLit

1957 Australian novels